is a Japanese athlete specialising in the long-distance events. She won two medals at the 2009 Summer Universiade – the gold in the 10,000 metres and the silver in the 5000 metres.

International competitions

Personal bests
Outdoor
3000 metres – 9:15.9 (Kyoto 2006)
5000 metres – 15:23.80 (Yamaguchi 2011)
10,000 metres – 31:53.69 (Kobe 2014)
10 kilometres – 32:26 (Okayama 2010)
Half marathon – 1:11:58 (Kyoto 2009)

References

External links 
 
 

1989 births
Living people
Japanese female long-distance runners
Asian Games competitors for Japan
Athletes (track and field) at the 2014 Asian Games
Universiade medalists in athletics (track and field)
Universiade gold medalists for Japan
Universiade silver medalists for Japan
Medalists at the 2009 Summer Universiade
World Athletics Championships athletes for Japan
Japan Championships in Athletics winners
Bukkyo University alumni
20th-century Japanese women
21st-century Japanese women